Beate Heister (born 5 October 1951) is a German billionaire heiress. She is one of the two children of Karl Albrecht, who founded the discount supermarket chain Aldi with his brother Theo.

Together with her brother Karl Albrecht Jr., she has a net worth of US$41.3 billion, as of 2020.

She is married to Peter Heister, and they have six children.

She, her husband Peter, and their son Peter Max Heister, all sit on Aldi's advisory board. She is "notoriously reclusive".

References

1951 births
German billionaires
Living people
Aldi people